Melissa (born 9 February 1982 as Myriam Shehab) is a Lebanese singer.

Musical career
Melissa was discovered by music producers Fady Bitar and Jean Saliba. When Melissa released her first album, Baddi Mennak, she was signed with Alam El Phan, an Egyptian record label known for being the record label of Samira Said and Haifa Wehbe. Melissa's second album, Mfakar Halak Min, was released via her current label, Rotana Records. Her third album Min Meen Khayef, was released in 2013 under Dilara Music Production.

Internationally, Melissa is known for her collaborations with Akon in the song "Yalli Naseeni", with Dr. Alban on the songs "Habibi" (Somebody Call My Name) in 2008 and "Tell Me What U Want" (Gharamak) in 2010 and Nayer in 2018 with "Leily Leily".

Discography

Studio albums

Singles

As solo-artist

As featured-artist

References

External links
 
 

1982 births
Living people
Lebanese Shia Muslims
21st-century Lebanese women singers
People from South Lebanon
Lebanese people of Iraqi descent